Winston Churchill High School may refer to a number of schools, all named after Winston Churchill, who was Prime Minister of the United Kingdom from 1940 to 1945 and from 1951 to 1955.

Canada
Winston Churchill High School (Lethbridge), Alberta
Sir Winston Churchill High School, in Calgary, Alberta
Sir Winston Churchill Secondary School (Vancouver), British Columbia
Churchill High School (Winnipeg), Manitoba
Winston Churchill Collegiate Institute (Winston Churchill CI, WCCI), in Scarborough, Toronto, Ontario
Sir Winston Churchill Collegiate & Vocational Institute, in Thunder Bay, Ontario
Sir Winston Churchill Secondary School (Hamilton, Ontario)
Sir Winston Churchill Secondary School (St. Catharines), Ontario

United Kingdom 
The Winston Churchill School, Woking

United States
Winston Churchill High School (Potomac, Maryland)
Winston Churchill High School (Livonia, Michigan)
Winston Churchill High School (Eugene, Oregon)
Churchill Area High School, in Churchill, Pennsylvania
Winston Churchill High School (San Antonio), Texas

Zimbabwe 
 Churchill School (Harare)

See also
 Lycée International de Londres Winston Churchill
 Churchill College, Cambridge
 Churchill Public School (disambiguation)
 Churchill School, in Baker City, Oregon
 Winston Churchill (disambiguation)